The Central Moravian Carpathians are a mountain range within the Czech Republic belonging to the Outer Western Carpathians.

Despite the name, they stand in southern Moravia, east of Brno. In the east, they border on the Slovak-Moravian Carpathians; in the south, they stretch down to the Thaya Valley and the South-Moravian Carpathians. The mountains are mostly forested, planted with beech and spruce trees.

Agriculture
It is one of the most important agricultural areas for wine grapes, apricots and peaches, and vegetables such as tomatoes, peppers and cucumbers.

Subdivision
The Central Moravian Carpathians are geomorphologically subdivided into:  
Ždánice Forest (Czech: Ždánický les)
Litenčice Hills (Litenčická pahorkatina)
Chřiby, with Mt. Brdo, highest point of the Moravian uplands
Kyjov Hills (Kyjovská pahorkatina).

Mountain ranges of the Czech Republic
Mountain ranges of the Western Carpathians